Ioan Tesler (1903–1942) was a Romanian footballer who played as a midfielder.

International career
Ioan Tesler played six friendly matches for Romania, making his debut on 31 May 1925 under coach Teofil Morariu in a 4–2 away victory against Bulgaria.

Scores and results table. Romania's goal tally first:

Honours
Chinezul Timișoara
Divizia A: 1924–25, 1925–26, 1926–27

Notes

References

External links
 

1903 births
1942 deaths
Romanian footballers
Romania international footballers
Place of birth missing
Association football midfielders
Liga I players
Chinezul Timișoara players